The discography of American music artist Patsy Cline consist of three studio albums, 24 singles, six extended plays, one compilation album, six other charted songs and one album appearance. Cline's discography contains material released during her lifetime. Her first recordings took place under the direction of Four Star Records. Cline's first single, "A Church, a Courtroom, Then Goodbye," was released in July 1955. Four Star  issued 17 singles during Cline's four years recording with them. However, only "Walkin' After Midnight" (1957) became a major hit, reaching number 2 on the Billboard country songs chart and number 12 on the Billboard pop music chart.

Cline signed with Decca Records in 1960, and thereafter her recordings brought her more commercial success. "I Fall to Pieces" was her first Decca single. It became her first number 1 hit on the Billboard country chart and a major crossover pop hit. A follow-up single, "Crazy," was also released in 1961, peaking at number 2 on the Billboard country chart and number 9 on the pop chart. Cline's second studio album, Showcase, was released the same year, and then re-released in 1963.

"She's Got You" was released in 1962 as Cline's next single. It became her second number 1 hit on the Billboard country songs chart, her fourth Billboard pop crossover hit, and her first single to chart in the United Kingdom. While awaiting a full album release, Decca issued several extended plays in 1962, including Patsy Cline and She's Got You. Cline's third studio album, Sentimentally Yours, was also issued in 1962. It was the final studio album issued in her lifetime. The last single issued during her lifetime was "Leavin' on Your Mind" in 1963. It reached the top 10 on the Billboard country chart after Cline's death in March 1963.

Albums

Studio albums

Compilation albums

Extended plays

Singles

Other charted songs

Other appearances

See also
 Patsy Cline posthumous discography

Notes

References

External links
 The Patsy Cline Discography by George Hewitt
 Patsy Cline at Discogs

Country music discographies
 
 
Discographies of American artists